Music of the Honey Gatherers is the second solo studio album by Bengali Baul singer and musician Paban Das Baul. The album was released in the United Kingdom on 24 May 2010 by Riverboat Records and World Music Network.

Production and recording
Some of the tracks used for the album were recorded on spare days, in between concerts and travels between 2006 and 2009. Few songs ware recorded at Paban's home in Montreuil, France. Other tracks were recorded in September 2009 at WAC Recording Studio in London along with Nimai Goswami. The rest of the songs ware recorded at Net Guru Studios in Kolkata.

Release and reception

The album was released in the United Kingdom on 24 November 2010 by Riverboat Records a subsidiary of UK based music company World Music Network.

Evening Standard commented the album "...some of the most ecstatic and beguiling music in the world". Financial Times says that "about six minutes into "Prem Katha Ti Shunte Bhalo", limber drums suddenly kick in, and transcendence hovers."

Track listing

References

Further reading

External links
 
 
 
 

2010 albums
Paban Das Baul albums